, also known as Karate Bullfighter, is a Japanese martial arts film made by the Toei Company in 1975. It was the first in a trilogy of films based on the manga Karate Baka Ichidai (literal translation: A Karate-Crazy Life), a manga based on Masutatsu Oyama's life by Ikki Kajiwara, Jiro Tsunoda and Jōya Kagemaru.
Sonny Chiba stars as his former master Oyama who was the founder of Kyokushin karate. Chiba would reprise this role in two more films Karate Bearfighter (1975), and Karate for Life (1977).

Plot
Korean-descent Japanese karate master who tries to prove that his karate is better than the modern "dance" karate.  Based on Mas Oyama portrayed by student and actor Sonny Chiba.

Cast
Sonny Chiba as Mas Oyama
Yumi Takigawa as Chiako
Mikio Narita as Nakasone
Katsumasa Uchida
Kenji Imai
Nenji Kobayashi 
Jirō Chiba as Shogo Ariake

References

External links
 Japanese Movie Database
 
 

1975 films
Films directed by Kazuhiko Yamaguchi
1970s Japanese-language films
Japanese action films
Karate films
Toei Company films
1970s Japanese films